Robert Juan Hoskins (September 16, 1945 – June 8, 1980) was an American football defensive tackle in the National Football League. He was drafted by the San Francisco 49ers in the 16th round of the 1969 NFL Draft. He played college football at Wichita State. 

Hoskins was born to a large family, having nine siblings. He attended high school in Evansville, lettering in football, baseball, and track. He received a scholarship to Wichita State, where he played for two years as a fullback and defensive end. He left the university due to family obligations before completing his eligibility. 

In 1969, he played minor league football for the Seattle Rangers of the Continental Football League, where he earned all-league honors as a defensive lineman. A tryout in the Canadian Football League was unsuccessful, however in the spring of 1969, he was drafted by the 49ers. 

Hoskins suffered injuries and saw little playing time in his first two seasons. However, playing on special teams in the 1971 NFC divisional playoff against the Washington Redskins, he recovered a mis-snapped ball in the end zone, in what proved to be the winning touchdown. Hoskins started all 14 games the next four seasons.

In 1974, in the midst of his career, Hoskins was diagnosed with Hodgkin's Disease and underwent treatment. This included two surgeries followed by cobalt therapy. Nonetheless, he was able to remain a starter until his retirement at age 30 after the 1975 season. 

He died of a heart attack in 1980.

References

1945 births
1980 deaths
American football defensive tackles
Wichita State Shockers football players
San Francisco 49ers players
People from Highland, Illinois